The traditional music of Ingushetia employs such musical instruments as the  (similar to a clarinet),  (similar to a ),  (accordion, played mostly by girls), violin (with three strings), drums and tambourine.

Music of the Caucasus
Ingushetia